Neena Prasad is an Indian dancer. She is an exponent in the field of Mohiniyattam. She is the founder and principal of Bharthanjali Academy of Indian Dances in Thiruvananthapuram and Sougandika Centre for Mohinyattam in Chennai.

Early life and education
She pursued dance education, achieving proficiency in Bharatanatyam, Kuchipudi, Mohiniyattam and Kathakali. After her MA in English Literature, she was awarded a PhD from Rabindra Bharati University, Calcutta, for her thesis on "The concepts of Lasya and Tandava in the classical dances of South India-A detailed Study". She was also awarded a post doctoral Research Fellowship from the AHRB Research Centre for Cross Cultural Music and Dance Performance, University of Surrey.

Her professional training included:
Mohiniyattam - Kalamandalam Sugandhi – 8 years
Kalamandalam Kshemavathy – 3 years
Bharatanatyam - Padmashri Adyar K. Lakshman – 11 years
Kuchipudi - Padmabhushan Vempatti China Satyam –12 years
Kathakali - Vembayam Appukuttan Pillai – 10 years

Awards
Prasad received the Kerala Sangeetha Nataka Akademi Award in 2007. She is a recipient of the Mayilpeeli Award. She also received the "Nirtya Chudamani" Award in 2015. Received Kerala Kalmandalam Award 2017 (Mohiniyattam)

References

Artists from Thiruvananthapuram
Indian female classical dancers
Performers of Indian classical dance
Dancers from Kerala
Mohiniyattam exponents
Living people
Women artists from Kerala
Year of birth missing (living people)
Recipients of the Kerala Sangeetha Nataka Akademi Award